Naro moru is a small market town in Nyeri County in central Kenya, lying on the Naromoru River, between Nyeri and Nanyukiits 21.8 km to Nanyuki town. Its main industry is tourism, as a base for hikers ascending Mount Kenya, to its east. It has several hotels and holiday tour organizers that bring groups of tourists. Solio Game Reserve lies near the town. The town was previously the center of the former Kieni East District. The town has an urban population of 2643 (1999 census ). The Naromoru River flows through the town.

The town has an elevation of around 2200 metres and is classed with having a tropical savannah climate with a winter dry season. There are farms growing vegetables such as peas, chillies, and safflowers (which are pressed for oil). Another plant is Eucalyptus. There is livestock such as cattle, chicken, and ostriches. 

The town has girls' and boys' secondary schools along with a Roman Catholic secondary school, and primary schools. It also has a home for children with disabilities (at Mung'etho shopping centre), and a private mixed primary school. 

Nyeri County
Mount Kenya